Charles Dunbar may refer to:

 Charles Davidson Dunbar (1870–1939), pipe major
 Charles E. Dunbar (1888–1959), attorney in the U.S. state of Louisiana
 Charles Franklin Dunbar (1830–1900), American economist
 Charles Augustus Royer Flood Dunbar (1849–1939), British admiral
 Charles Dunbar (British Army officer) (1919–1981), British general
 Charles Franklin Dunbar (diplomat), American diplomat